Adriacentrus is an extinct genus of prehistoric bony fish that lived from the Turonian.

References

Late Cretaceous fish
Beryciformes
Prehistoric ray-finned fish genera